Li Tieying (born 1936) is a retired politician of the People's Republic of China. He held many positions since 1955, including Vice Chairman of the Standing Committee of the National People's Congress and President of the Chinese Academy of Social Sciences. He is an author of several books. For more than 20 years he served as Minister in charge of the State Commission for Economic Restructuring, and participated in major decision making and the implementation of China's economic reforms during that time.

Early life 

Li was born September 1936 in Changsha, Hunan province. When studying at No. 2 Middle School attached to Beijing Normal University and Beijing Russian Language Training School (now Beijing Foreign Studies University) from 1950 to 1955, he joined the Chinese Communist Party (CCP) in April 1955.

He started working in September 1961 as a senior engineer, after graduating from Faculty of Mathematics and Physics of Charles University in Czechoslovakia.

Career 
 Technician, deputy department director of No. 13 Research Institute of Ministry of National Defense in 1961–1966 (studied Japanese in Shanghai Foreign Languages Institute, now Shanghai International Studies University in 1964–1965); 
 deputy department director of No. 1413 Research Institute of Fourth Machine-building Ministry in 1966–1970; 
 department director of the ministry's No. 1424 Research Institute in 1970–1978; 
 chief engineer, deputy director of the ministry's No. 1447 Research Institute, and concurrently deputy chairman of Shenyang City Commission of Science and Technology and Liaoning Provincial Association for Science and Technology in 1978–1981.
 Secretary, executive secretary of CCP Shenyang City Committee in 1981–1983; 
 secretary of CCP Liaoning Provincial Committee in 1983–1984; 
 secretary of CCP Liaoning Provincial Committee and concurrently secretary of CCP Haicheng County Committee, Liaoning Province, in 1984–1985. 
 Minister of electronics industry, secretary of the ministry's Leading Party Members' Group in 1985–1987. 
 Member of Political Bureau of CCP Central Committee, minister in charge of State Commission for Restructuring the Economy, secretary of the commission's Leading Party Members' Group, minister of electronics industry and secretary of the ministry's Leading Party Members' Group in 1987–1988.
 Member of Political Bureau of CCP Central Committee, state councilor and concurrently minister in charge of State Education Commission and secretary of its Leading Party Members' Group in 1988–1993.
 Member of Political Bureau of CCP Central Committee, state councilor and concurrently minister in charge of State Commission for Restructuring the Economy in 1993–1998.
 Member of Political Bureau of CCP Central Committee, president of Chinese Academy of Social Sciences and secretary of its Leading Party Members' Group in 1998–2002.
 President of Chinese Academy of Social Sciences and secretary of its Leading Party Members' Group in 2002 – January 2003.
 Alternate member, member of 12th CCP Central Committee; member, Political Bureau member of 13th, 14th, 15th CCP Central Committee.

Published works
Enrich Series on China's Economic Reform published by Enrich Professional Publishing
Vol.1 Reforming China: Theoretical Framework
Vol 2. Reforming China: Experiences and Lessons
Vol.3 Reforming China: Major Events (1978–1991)
Vol.4 Reforming China: Major Events (1992–2004)
Vol.5 Reforming China: International Comparisons and Reference

References

1936 births
Living people
Politicians from Changsha
People's Republic of China politicians from Hunan
Political office-holders in Liaoning
Chinese Communist Party politicians from Hunan
Beijing Foreign Studies University alumni
Charles University alumni
Members of the 15th Politburo of the Chinese Communist Party
Members of the 14th Politburo of the Chinese Communist Party
Members of the 13th Politburo of the Chinese Communist Party
State councillors of China
Ministers of Education of the People's Republic of China
Vice Chairpersons of the National People's Congress